Ruaidhrí Murphy is a former professional Rugby Union player who last played for Ulster Rugby in the 2015–16 season. Ruaidhrí's position of choice is prop. Ruaidhri is a former pupil of Castleknock College in Dublin and represented Leinster Schools and Ireland Schools during his school days at Castleknock. He was a member of the Ireland team at the Under 19 World Cup in Dubai before moving to Leinster Rugby and was part of the Under 20 Six Nations and Grand Slam winning side of 2007.

Murphy joined Exeter Chiefs in 2009 but was unable to break into the Chiefs first team, he remained with the squad and was part of the Chiefs 2009/10 RFU Championship winning side. With Exeter in the Aviva Premiership he featured only once in Premiership competition.

At the conclusion of the 2011 season Murphy left Exeter for Australia and joined Easts Tigers Rugby Union in Brisbane.  He then joined Gungahlin Eagles, before earning a spot with the Brumbies.

As a youngster Murphy spent a large part of his youth in Perth where his father owns a business, Murphy has a strong appreciation for Australia and his long-term goal is to represent the Wallabies.

In 2014, Ulster Rugby announced that Murphy would return to Ireland by joining them on a two-year deal after the 2014 Super Rugby season.

References

External links
Aviva Premiership Player Profile
Brumbies Profile
itsrugby.co.uk Profile

1987 births
Living people
Irish rugby union players
Exeter Chiefs players
ACT Brumbies players
Ulster Rugby players
Rugby union props
Rugby union players from Dublin (city)
Irish expatriate rugby union players
Expatriate rugby union players in Australia
Expatriate rugby union players in England
Irish expatriate sportspeople in England
Irish expatriate sportspeople in Australia